Llorenç Piera Grau (born 4 November 1996) is a Spanish field hockey player who plays as a defender for Real Club de Polo and the Spanish national team.

International career
At the 2019 EuroHockey Championship, Piera won his first medal with the senior national team as they finished second. On 25 May 2021, he was selected in the squad for the 2021 EuroHockey Championship. He competed in the 2020 Summer Olympics.

References

External links

1996 births
Living people
Spanish male field hockey players
Olympic field hockey players of Spain
Male field hockey defenders
Field hockey players at the 2014 Summer Youth Olympics
Field hockey players at the 2020 Summer Olympics
Real Club de Polo de Barcelona players
División de Honor de Hockey Hierba players
Place of birth missing (living people)